The Tracker, also known as Dead or Alive in some countries, is a 1988 Western television film directed by John Guillermin, written by Kevin Jarre, and starring Kris Kristofferson, Scott Wilson, Mark Moses, David Huddleston, John Quade and Don Swayze. It premiered on HBO on March 26, 1988.

It was the 36th and final film directed by Guillermin, before his death in 2015.

Plot
Noble Adams served as a scout in the US Army during the Indian Wars. He resigns and takes his wife and two-year-old son to a farm he has bought. On the way, his wife dies in an accident. His son receives a good education on the east coast and studies law. After his exam Tom returns to his father for a short time. One day Noble is asked by his old friend Marshall Crawford for help in the pursuit of the gang led by John Stillwell, who escaped from the Yuma penitentiary. The bandits murder some people and kidnap two women, a twelve-year-old girl and an Indian. Tom wants to join the persecution. His father is against it, because he is convinced that his son is not up to the strains of the persecution. However, Tom prevails. Noble, his son and the marshal pursue the gang, on which a reward of 500 $ is exposed. They meet a group of bounty hunters who are deserted soldiers. During a sandstorm, the three seek cover behind rocks as best they can. Stillwell and his gang find shelter in a Pueblo (Indian village built into a rock). Because Noble knows that the bandits want to cross the river with the only ferry, they take a tiring shortcut. At the ferry, the bounty hunters get in their way. In the shooting, Stillwell kills the marshal.

Again and again there are conflicts between father and son. The father still lives in an atavistic world, in which life kills by the rule, so that you are not killed dominated. The son has a human behavior shaped by the civilized East Coast. Noble and Tom set another trap for the gang. Noble kills all gang members. Tom has been waiting for Stillwell. He has put his rifle on him and hesitates for a moment. Stillwell takes the girl to his horse. Tom can't shoot anymore. Noble and Tom meet as arranged with Indians, who bring them fresh horses and supplies. The older sister and the father of the girl are also at this meeting point. Noble wants to free the girl alone and follows the trail. Tom suddenly knows where Stillwell will hide. It can only be the Pueblo. He rides straight there. His father frees the girl and captures Stillwell. Stillwell distracts him with a trick and shoots him in the stomach with a hidden Derringer. Stillwell takes the girl on his horse and rides towards Utah. Tom arrives a short time later. His father tells him that he is mortally wounded. Tom promises to free the girl. He poses Stillwell, who surrenders. When Stillwell tries to outsmart him with the same trick, Tom shoots him. When Tom returns to his father, he dies shortly afterwards.

The final picture shows Tom inviting his father's coffin into a train. The two sisters are also on the platform. He promises his older sister, with whom he grew up in his youth, to visit her in a few months.

Cast

Production
The film had been in development for five years. The film was shot on location in Colorado and New Mexico in October 1987 under the title Dead or Alive.

Reception
The Wall Street Journal called it a " handsome, no-nonsense, no-spaghetti western."

The Chicago Tribune said " it's not bad at all."

The Globe and Mail said "The Kristofferson character is straight out of the Eastwood mold but even dirtier than Harry. But what makes him (and the movie) intriguing is his obvious tenderness for his grown son, wonderfully and endearingly played by Mark Moses. Their relationship gives the otherwise formula oater a much needed extra dimension."

An article on Guillermin's career in Film Comment said the film "marks a surprising return to something resembling form." Another in Filmink called it "a polite late ‘80s western... with some baddies kidnapping women and Kristofferson leading a posse, and his son learning the importance of killing people. The dust feels clean. Look, it’s fine."

References

External links
 
 The Tracker at BFI
 The Tracker at Letterbox DVD
 

1988 television films
1988 Western (genre) films
American Western (genre) television films
Films directed by John Guillermin
Films scored by Sylvester Levay
HBO Films films
1980s English-language films